A large number of former National Football League (NFL) players have been diagnosed with or have had chronic traumatic encephalopathy, or CTE. A definitive diagnosis so far can be made only post-mortem. However, an increasing number of former players are reporting symptoms of CTE.

According to 2017 study on brains of deceased gridiron football players, 99% of tested brains of NFL players, 88% of Canadian Football League (CFL) players, 64% of semi-professional players, 91% of college football players, and 21% of high school football players had various stages of CTE. However, this study had several limitations, including possible selection bias as families of players with symptoms of CTE are far more likely to donate brains to research than those without signs of the disease. Despite the limitations, the study still showed that CTE is far more common than once believed.

Other common injuries include injuries of legs, arms, and lower back.

Players affected
Many football players affected by CTE have played professionally, but others have also been affected by or live with the possibility of having CTE.

In July 2011, Colts tight end John Mackey died after several years of deepening symptoms of frontotemporal dementia. The Boston University School of Medicine (BUSM) was reported to be planning to examine his brain for signs of CTE. The Brain Bank found CTE in his brain post-mortem.

On July 27, 2012, an autopsy report concluded that the former Atlanta Falcons safety Ray Easterling, who died from suicide in April 2012, had CTE.

On February 4, 2016, an autopsy report from Massachusetts confirmed CTE in Ken Stabler's brain after his death. Stabler, an NFL MVP and Hall of Famer, was diagnosed with high Stage 3 CTE. Stage 4 is the most aggressive stage of the disease.

Heisman Trophy winner and former NFL All-Pro Bo Jackson said in a 2017 interview with USA Today that if he had known about the risks associated with CTE, he would never have played football, and he discourages his children from doing so. In late 2017, former Kansas City Chiefs running back Larry Johnson reported having symptoms akin to Aaron Hernandez, including memory blanks, suicidal thoughts and thoughts of committing violent acts. Although there is no way to positively diagnose CTE before death, Johnson believes he is living with the disease.

Former players with CTE confirmed post-mortem 
A common definitive test currently can be made only by examining the brain tissue of a deceased victim.

As the families of many deceased players wish to keep their medical information private, the following list is incomplete. A brain injury study conducted at the Boston University School of Medicine showed that 33 of 34 players tested post-mortem showed clear signs of CTE, and additional players have so far been confirmed with CTE separately. A new list released in November 2016 mentions CTE in 90 of 94 brains of former and deceased NFL players. In July 2017, a new study showed that 110 of 111 brains examined showed signs of CTE.

 Phillip Adams
 George Andrie
 Dave Behrman
 Jovan Belcher
 Wes Bender
 Forrest Blue
 Dorian Boose
 Daniel Brabham
 Colt Brennan
 Nick Buoniconti
 Lew Carpenter
 Ronnie Caveness
 Dwight Clark
 Greg Clark
 Daniel Colchico
 Lou Creekmur
 Art DeCarlo
 Willie Daniel
 George Darrah
 Tom DeLeone
 Shane Dronett
 Dave Duerson
 Pete Duranko
 Ray Easterling
 Grant Feasel
 Cullen Finnerty
 Frank Gifford
 Daren Gilbert
 Cookie Gilchrist
 John Grimsley
 Jason Hairston
 Darryl Hammond
 Chris Henry
 Aaron Hernandez
 Wally Hilgenberg
 Glen Ray Hines
 Jim Houston
 Jim Hudson
 Gerry Huth
 Vincent Jackson
 John Henry Johnson
 Tom Keating
 Bob Kuechenberg
 Jim Kiick
 Bill Lenkaitis
 Greg Lens
 Terry Long
 Edward Lothamer
 Rob Lytle
 Charles Mackey
 John Mackey
 Ollie Matson
 Tommy McDonald
 Keli McGregor
 Tom McHale
 Fred McNeill
 Earl Morrall
 Larry Morris
 Tommy Nobis
 Joe O'Malley
 Paul Oliver
 Chuck Osborne
 Joe Perry
 Mike Pyle
 Bob Riley
 Adrian Robinson
 Isiah Robertson
 Rocky Rosema
 Scott Ross
 Tyler Sash
 Eric Scoggins
 Clyde Scott
 Jake Scott
 Junior Seau
 Bubba Smith
 Robert Sowell
 Ken Stabler
 Bill Stanfill
 Justin Strzelczyk
 Mosi Tatupu
 Daniel Te'o-Nesheim
 Demaryius Thomas
 Kevin Turner
 Tommy Vaughn
 Fulton Walker
 Andre Waters
 Mike Webster
 Ralph Wenzel
 Jesse Whittenton
 John Wilbur
 Ben Williams
 Jeff Winans
 Dennis Wirgowski
 Willie Wood

Deceased players suspected of having had CTE
Included in the list are players diagnosed with amyotrophic lateral sclerosis (ALS) who were never tested post-mortem for CTE but whose history appears consistent with CTE. A typical diagnosis of ALS has primarily been based on the symptoms and signs the physician observes in the patient and a series of tests to rule out other diseases and therefore, prior to the discovery of CTE as a phenomenon in ex-American football players, many CTE cases were diagnosed as ALS.  The testing of CTE in deceased former NFL players began only after the disease was first diagnosed, in 2002, in the brain tissue of Mike Webster. After then, testing became common practice only gradually. A cohort mortality study run by the National Institute for Occupational Safety and Health (NIOSH) examined 3,349 NFL players who played at least five full seasons from 1959 to 1988. Findings showed that while NFL players lived longer than the average American male, the risk of death associated with neurodegenerative disorders was about three times higher among the NFL cohort. The risk for death from Alzheimer's disease and ALS were about four times higher among the NFL cohort.

Some on this list may have had dementia not related to ALS or CTE.

 Curtis Brown
 Gene Hickerson
 Lawrence Phillips
 Jim Ringo
 Steve Smith

Living former players diagnosed with CTE or ALS or reporting symptoms consistent with CTE or ALS
These players have publicly acknowledged either having been diagnosed with likely CTE or having experienced symptoms, such as dementia or unusual memory loss, consistent with CTE. In some cases, the player has received a diagnosis of ALS but symptoms are consistent with CTE. There are at least two dozen former players who were diagnosed as part of a UCLA study but have not come forward publicly. There are also around 4,500 former players who joined a class action lawsuit against the NFL alleging that it had covered up a growing body of medical evidence about the preponderance of head-trauma related CTE in ex-NFL players.

Some of these ex-players may have medical conditions other than CTE or ALS. For example, ex-players that have presented with symptoms late in life may have other forms of age-related dementia. Some of the former players on this list came forward only in the context of the class action lawsuit versus the NFL. At present, there is no definitive CTE test available for living persons. Their average age is 51.

 Mike Adamle (age )
 Brent Boyd (age )
 O. J. Brigance (age )
 Lance Briggs (age )
 Chris Brymer (age )
 Wayne Clark (age )
 Joe DeLamielleure (age )
 Tony Dorsett (age )
 Mark Duper (age )
 Brett Favre (age )
 Charlie Garner (age )
 Steve Gleason (age )
 Andrew Glover (age )
 Tim Green (age )
 Dwight Harrison (age )
 Larry Johnson(age )
 Ted Johnson (age )
 Bernie Kosar (age )
 Fulton Kuykendall (age )
 Dorsey Levens (age )
 Jamal Lewis (age )
 Leonard Marshall (age )
 Ricardo McDonald (age )
 Jim McMahon (age )
 Bob Meeks (age )
 Matthew Monger (age )
 Sean Morey (age )
 Guy Morriss
 Frank Orgel 
 Antwaan Randle El (age )
 George Rogers (age )
 Antonio Brown (age )
 Tim Shaw (age )
 O.J. Simpson  (age )
 Ryan Stewart (age )
 Darryl Talley (age )
 Kyle Turley (age )
 Mitch White (age )
 Frank Wycheck (age )

Former players listed as plaintiffs in lawsuits against the NFL for concussion-related injuries received after playing 
This list is incomplete.  The NFL reportedly reached a settlement in 2013 with around 4,500 former players (or their estates).  This list currently contains fewer than half that number.

 Khalid Abdullah
 Robert Abraham
 Sid Abramowitz
 Bobby E. Abrams Jr.
 Ron Acks
 Tony Adams
 George Adams
 Henry Adams
 Keith Adams
 Robert Adams
 Scott Adams
 Vashone Adams
 Margene Adkins
 Louie Aguiar
 Chidi Ahanotu
 David Ahrens
 Samaji Akili
 Ethan Albright
 Arnold Ale
 Charles Alexander Jr.
 David Alexander
 Roc Alexander
 Vernest Alexander
 Eric Allen
 Dalva Allen
 Terry T. Allen
 James Althoff
 Martin Amsler
 Michael Andersen
 Alfred Anderson
 Donny Anderson
 Erick Anderson
 Fred Anderson
 Garry (Donny) Anderson
 Jamal Anderson
 Kim Anderson
 Ottis Anderson
 Richard Anderson
 Roger Anderson III
 Charles Anthony
 Cornelius Anthony
 Reidel Anthony
 Lionel Antoine
 Shellye Archambeau
 Jojuan Armour
 Harvey Armstrong
 Richard Arndt
 Mark Arneson
 Jon Arnett
 James Arnold
 Joseph Aska Jr.
 Peter Athas
 Mike Augustyniak
 William Austin
 Reginald Austin
 Robert Avellini
 John Avery
 Steve Baack
 Charlie Babb
 Robert Babich
 Curtis Baham
 Elmer Bailey
 Karsten Bailey
 Mario Bailey
 Robert Bailey
 William Bain
 Jame Baisleys Jr.
 Ralph Baker
 Brian Baldinger
 Gary Baldinger
 Richard Baldinger
 Sam Ball
 John Banaszak
 Fred Ray Banks
 Mike Banks
 Michael Bankston
 Warren Bankston
 Gary Barbaro
 Christopher Barber
 Roy Barker
 Jerome Barkum
 Kevan Barlow
 Reggie Barlow
 Allen Barnes
 Billy Ray Barnes
 Jeff Barnes
 Larry Barnes
 Lew Barnes
 Fred Barnett
 Timothy Barnett
 Lemuel Barney
 Steve Bartkowski
 James Barton
 Brian Baschnagel
 Idress Bashir
 Mike Bass
 Eric Bassey
 Larry Bates
 Patrick Bates
 Michael Batiste
 Marco Battaglia
 James Battle
 Steve Baumgartner
 Aaron Beasley
 Derrick Beasley
 Terry Beasley
 Doug Beaudoin
 Jeff Beaver
 Aubrey Beavers
 Brett Bech
 Kurt Becker
 Rogers Beckett
 Don Beebe
 Thomas Beer
 Monty Beisel
 Anthony Bell
 Billy Bell
 Robert Bell
 Bruce Bell
 Edward Bell
 Grantis Bell
 Ken Bell
 Nickolas Bell
 Rodney Bellinger
 Donnell Bennett
 Woody Bennett
 Charles Benson
 Mitchell Benson
 Troy Benson
 Pete Bercich
 Bob Berry
 Gary Berry
 Sean Berton
 Don Bessillieu
 Eric Beverly
 Richard Bielski
 Keith Biggers
 Guy Bingham
 Ryon Bingham
 Joseph Biscaha
 Bill Bishop
 Harold Bishop
 Ken Blackman
 Lyle Blackwood
 Lyle Blackwood Jr.
 Willie Blade
 Brian Blades
 Horatio Blades
 Robert Blanchard
 Ruben Scott Blanton
 Anthony Blaylock
 Michael Blazitz
 Phillip Bobo
 Joseph Bock
 Dominec Boddie
 Nicholas Bolkovac
 Andrew Bolton
 Ronald Bolton
 Scott Bolzan
 Vaughn Booker
 Ryan Boschetti
 Keith Bostic
 Michael Boulware
 Emil Boures
 Sam Bowers
 Charles Bowser
 Bobby Boyd
 Brent Boyd
 Gregory Boyd
 Greg Bracelin
 Ed Bradley
 Henry Bradley
 Otha Bradley
 Bill Bradley
 Kyle Brady
 Stephen Braggs
 Dennis Bragonier
 Daniel Brandenburg
 David Brandon
 Scot Brantley
 Melvin Bratton
 Robert Brazile
 Jeff Bregel
 John Brewer
 Greg Brewton
 Lamont Brightful
 Vincent Brisby
 Jerry Broadnax
 Vaughn Broadnax
 Timothy Broady
 John Brodie
 Kevin Brooks
 Michael Brooks
 James Brophy
 Luther Broughton
 Steven Broussard
 Aaron Brown
 Cedric Brown
 Chad Brown
 Charles Brown
 Curtis Brown
 Deauntae Brown
 Edward Brown
 Fakhir Brown
 Gregory Brown
 Joseph "Berry" Brown
 Lance Brown
 Lomas Brown
 Marc S. Brown
 Raymond Brown
 Reggie Brown
 Regilyn Brown
 Reginald Brown
 Robert L. Brown
 Robert Lee Brown
 Roger Brown
 Ronald Brown
 Terry Brown
 Keith Browner
 Ross Browner
 Lydia Brunet
 Bob Brunet
 Jeffrey Bryant
 Maurice Bryant
 Warren Bryant
 Miguel ("Mike") Bryce-Dingle
 Vince Buck
 Robert Buczkowski
 Ed Budde
 Dan Buenning
 Danny Buggs
 Drew Buie
 Rudolph Bukich
 Norman Bulaich
 Courtland Bullard
 Courtland Bullard Jr.
 Jarrod Bunch
 Jim Bundren
 James Burgess
 Randall William Burke
 Bobby Burnett
 Joe Burns
 Jeff Burris
 Derrick Burroughs
 Noah Burroughs
 Kenneth Burrow
 Blair Bush
 Andy Bushak
 Dexter Bussey
 Robert Butler
 Duane Butler
 Leroy Butler
 Michael Butler
 Raymond Butler
 Keith Byars
 Carl Byrum
 James Cadile
 William Cahill
 Kenneth Callicut
 Kenneth Callicutt
 Christopher Calloway
 Richard Camarillo
 Lamar Campbell
 Woody Campbell
 James Cannida
 John Cappelletti
 Joe Carmen
 Albert Carmichael
 Brett Carolan
 Joe Carollo
 Ronald Carpenter Jr.
 William Carr
 Roger Carr
 Alphonso Carreker
 Paul Carrington
 Travis Carroll
 Allen Carter
 Dale Carter
 Jonathan Carter
 Lavonya Carter
 Michael Carter
 Rubin Carter
 Virgil Carter
 Johndale Carty
 Melvin Carver
 Shante Carver
 Scott Case
 Richard Cash
 Tom Cassese
 Mark Catano
 Carmen Cavalli
 Mario Celotto
 Eugene Ceppetelli
 Gordon Ceresino
 Byron Chamberlain
 Chris Chambers
 Dionna Chambers
 Robert Chancey
 Lindsey Chapman
 John Charles
 Michael Cheever
 Darrin Chiaverini
 Mark Chmura
 Jason Chorak
 Herbert Christopher
 Earl Christy
 Greg Christy
 Jeff Christy
 Eugene Chung
 Vinny Ciurciu
 Darryl Clack
 Allan V. Clark
 Gail Clark
 Jamal Clark
 Kenneth Clark
 Mario Clark
 Randy Clark
 Reginald Clark
 Stephen Clark
 Vincent Clark
 Wayne Clark
 Kenneth Clarke
 Raymond Clayborn
 Felipe Claybrooks
 Harvey Clayton
 Cam Cleeland
 Anthony Cline Sr.
 Tony F. Cline Jr.
 Jonathan Clinkscale
 Michael Cloud
 Ben Coates
 Tony Coats
 Garry Cobb
 Marvin Cobb
 Joe Cocozzo
 Sherman Cocroft
 Ron Coder
 Gail Cogdill
 Daniel Colchico
 Larry Cole
 Lincoln Coleman Jr.
 Roderick Coleman
 Cosey Coleman
 Anthony Collins
 Calvin Collins
 Frank Collins
 Glen Collins
 Mark Collins
 Mo Collins
 Shawn Collins
 Ben Colman
 James Colvin
 Chuck Commiskey
 Glen Condren
 Mike Connelly
 John Connon
 Scott Conover
 John Contoulis
 Edward Cooke
 William Cooke
 Robert Cooksey
 Robert Coons
 Chris Cooper
 Deke Cooper
 Earl Cooper
 Jarrod Cooper
 Mark Cooper
 Obadiah Cooper
 Danny Copeland
 Horace Copeland
 Gowdy Cornell
 Frank Cornish III
 Quentin Coryatt
 Doug Cosbie
 Marcia Cosma
 Dave Costa
 Paul Costa
 Mark Cotney
 James Cotton
 Marcus Cotton
 Terry Cousin
 James Covert
 Anthony Covington
 Arthur Cox
 Tom Cox
 Eric Crabtree
 Francisco Craig
 Neal Craig
 Vernon Crawford
 Joe Cribbs
 Henri Crockett
 Keaton Cromartie
 Pete Cronan
 Cleveland Crosby
 Ronald Crosby
 David Crossan
 Charles Crow
 Lindon Crow
 Harry Crump
 Bob Cryder
 James Culbreath
 Curley Culp
 Brad Culpepper
 Carl Cunningham
 Michael Curcio
 William Curran
 Craig Curry
 Eric Curry
 George Curry
 Tom Curtis
 Randy Cuthbert
 Dave D'Addio
 Antico Dalton
 Lional Dalton
 Mike D'Amato
 William Daniel
 Chartric Darby
 Matt Darby
 Trey Darilek
 Don Davey
 Kenneth Davidson
 Al Davis
 Dexter Davis
 Elgin Davis
 John Davis Jr.
 Johnnie Lee Davis
 Johnny Davis
 Kenneth Davis
 Michael "Tony" Davis
 Mitchell Davis
 Oliver Davis
 Ronald Davis
 Russell Davis
 Thabiti Davis
 Troy Davis
 Tyrone Davis
 Wallace Davis
 Wendell Davis
 Fred Dean
 Vernon Dean
 Joe DeLamielleure
 Greg DeLong
 Robert Delpino
 Bob Demarco
 John Demarie
 Glenn Derby
 Brian Deroo
 Chuck Detwiler
 Anthony Dickerson
 Kenneth Dickerson Sr.
 Curtis Dickey
 Scott Dierking
 Christian Dieterich
 Stacey Dillard
 Bucky Dilts
 Gennaro DiNapoli
 Adrian Dingle
 Robert Dirico
 Corey Dixon
 Ernest Dixon
 Floyd Dixon
 Hanford Dixon
 Herbert Dobbins
 Conrad Dobler
 Kirk Dodge
 Jason Doering
 Stephen Doig
 Christopher Doleman
 Jeff Donaldson
 Doug Donley
 Michael Donohoe
 Coy Donohue
 Thomas Donquail
 Matthew Dorsett
 Tony Dorsett
 Eric Dorsey
 Reggie Doss
 David Douglas
 Maurice Douglass
 Rome Douglas
 Scott Dragos
 Troy Drayton
 Doug Dressler
 Shane Dronett
 James Druckenmiller
 Mark Duda
 A.J. Duhe
 Chris Duliban
 Jonathan Dumbauld
 James Brian Duncan
 Jamie Duncan
 Kenneth Dunek
 Leonard Dunlap
 London Dunlap
 Reggie Dupard
 Mark Duper
 Billy Joe Dupree
 Marcus Dupree
 Pete Duranko
 Sandy Durko
 Dusty Dvoracek
 Robin Earl
 Kenny Easley
 A Doug Easlick
 Ray Easterling (deceased)
 Irvin Eatman
 Chad Eaton
 Scott Eaton
 Tracey Eaton
 John Ebersole
 Brad Edelman
 Kalimba Edwards
 Chris Edmonds
 Marc Edwards
 Mario Edwards
 Robert Edwards
 Timothy Edwards Jr.
 Tyrone Edwards
 Ronald Egloff
 Chuck Ehin
 Gary Ellerson
 Craig Ellis
 Edward Ellis
 Ken Ellis
 Ray Ellis
 Richard Ellis
 Dave Elmendorf
 Jimbo Elrod
 Bert Emanuel
 Derek Engler
 Phil Epps
 Paul Ernster
 Michael Esposito
 Lawrence Estes
 Gregory Evans
 Larry Evans
 Michael Evans
 Kevin Everett
 Major Everett
 Steve Everitt
 Nuu Faaola
 Jim Fahnhorst
 Terry Fair
 Ken Fantetti
 Mel Farr Jr.
 Michael Farr
 Trev Faulk
 Jeff Faulkner
 Gerald Feehery
 Rick Fenney
 Joe Ferguson
 Keith Ferguson
 Bill Ferrario
 Brad Fichtel
 Ascotti (Scott) Fields
 Edgar Fields
 Mark Fields
 Dan Fike
 Matter Finkes
 Jim Finn
 Levar Fisher
 John Fitzgerald
 Jim Flanigan
 Flint Fleming
 Steve Foley
 Lee Folkins
 Bernard Ford
 Brad Ford
 Jay Foreman
 Fred Forsberg
 Elliot Fortune
 Barry Foster
 Roy Foster
 Elbert Foules
 Jamal Fountaine
 John Fourcade
 Ryan Fowler
 Tim Fox
 Bobby Franklin
 Byron Franklin Sr.
 Jane Frederickson
 Rob Frederickson
 Solomon Freelon
 Lorenzo Freeman
 Mike Freeman
 Phillip Freeman
 Rockne Freitas
 William Frizzell
 David Fulcher
 Mike Fuller
 Darrell Fullington
 Frenchy Fuqua
 Dominic Furio
 Anthony Furjanic
 Michael Thomas Furrey
 Oronde Gadsden
 Derrick Gaffney
 Lawrence Gagner
 George Gaiser
 Scott Galbraith
 Duane Galloway
 Scott Galyon
 Mike Gann
 Mark Garalczyk
 Frank Garcia
 James Garcia
 Talman Gardner
 Thomas Garlick
 Kelvin Garmon
 Kevin Garrett
 Walt Garrison
 Percell Gaskins
 Jim Gatziolis
 Akbar Gbaja-Biamila
 Jumpy Geathers
 Kenneth Geddes
 Chris Gedney
 Mitchell Geier
 Chris Geile
 Dennis Gentry
 Jammi German
 Ronnie Ghent
 Antonio Gibson
 Ernest Gibson
 Jimmie Giles
 Darrel Gill
 Hubert Ginn
 Reggie Gipson
 Bob Gladieux
 Brian Glasgow
 Lamarr Glenn
 Andrew Glover
 Randall Godfrey
 Leo Goeas
 Brad Goebel
 George Goeddeke
 Jack Golden
 Austin Gonsoulin
 Chris Goode
 Conrad Goode
 Kerry Goode
 Robert Hunter Goodwin
 Tom Goosby
 Jeff Gossett
 Leonard Gotshalk
 Kurt Gouveia
 Cornell Gowdy
 Jim Grabowski
 Randy Gradishar
 Neil Graff
 William Graham
 Darryl Grant
 Bob Grant
 Marsharne Graves
 Rory Graves
 Carlton Gray
 Melvin Gray
 Terry Gray
 David Grayson
 Donald Greco
 Donnie Green
 Woody Green
 George ("Tiger") Greene
 Guy Green
 Hugh Green
 Jacob Green
 Jacquez Green
 Jarvis Green
 Paul Green
 Roy Green
 Victor Green
 Willie Green
 Kenneth Greene
 Carl Greenwood
 David Greenwood
 Curtis Greer
 Robert Gregor
 James Grier
 Frank Griffin
 Jeff Griffin
 John Griffin
 Keith Griffin
 Ray Griffin
 Howard Griffith
 William Griggs III
 Alfred Gross
 Jake Grove
 Paul Gruber
 Robert Grupp
 Eric Guliford
 Mike Guman
 Mark Gunn
 Keith Guthrie
 Myron Guyton
 Adam Haayer
 Dale Hackbart
 Drew Haddad
 Michael Haddix
 Samuel Haddix
 David Hadley
 Britt Hager
 Kris Haines
 John Haines
 Carl Hairston
 James Hall
 Ronald Hall
 Ronnie Haliburton
 Ron Hallstrom
 Darren Hambrick
 Troy Hambrick
 Keith Hamilton
 Ruffin Hamilton
 Steven Hamilton
 Gary Hammond
 Jermaine Hampton
 Rodney Hampton
 Anthony Hancock
 Kevin Hancock
 Charley Hannah
 Terry Hanratty
 Chet Hanulak
 Bobby Harden
 Mike Harden
 Arnell Hardison
 William Hardison
 Cedrick Hardman
 Terry Hardy
 Anthony Hargain
 James Hargrove
 Andy Harmon
 Clarence Harmon Jr.
 Dennis Harrah
 Charley Harraway
 James Harrell
 Al Harris
 Cliff Harris
 Duriel Harris
 Elroy Harris Jr.
 Joe Harris
 Kevin Harris
 Kwame Harris
 Leonard Harris
 Marques Harris
 Robert Harris
 Sean Harris
 Dwight Harrison
 Lloyd Harrison
 Jeff Hart
 Greg Hartle
 Frank Hartley
 Len Hauss
 Sam Havrilak
 Chilton Hawkins
 Wayne Hawkins
 Brandon Hayes
 Frederick Hayes
 Frederick R. Hayes
 Michael Haynes
 Harold Hays
 Herman Heard
 Garrison Hearst
 Johnny Hector
 Patrick Heenan
 Craig Heimburger
 Ron Heller
 Dale Hellestrae
 Keith Henderson
 Reuben Henderson
 Thomas "Hollywood" Henderson
 Wyatt Henderson
 Thomas Hendricks
 Brian Henesey
 Edgar Henke
 Charley Hennigan
 Terry Hermeling
 Steven Herndon
 Don Herrmann
 Bruce Herron
 Ronald Hester
 Ralph Heywood
 John Hicks
 Lamarcus Hicks
 Victor Hicks
 Darrell Hill
 David Hill
 Demetrius Hill
 Efrem Hill
 Eric Hill
 J. D. Hill
 Kahlil Hill
 Kent Hill
 Lonzell Hill
 Marcus Hill
 Raion Hill
 Sean Hill
 Bryan Hinkle
 Michael Hinnant
 Eddie Hinton
 Terry Hoage
 Michael Hoban
 Stephen Hobbs
 Liffort Hobley
 Lincoln Hodgdon
 Floyd Hodge
 Sedrick Hodge
 William Hoggard
 Kelly Holcomb
 Stephen Holden
 Eric Holle
 Joey Hollenbeck
 Brian Holloway
 Rodney Holman
 Bruce Holmes
 Jerry Holmes
 Joseph Holmes
 Leroy Holt Jr.
 Samuel Horner III
 James Hood
 Fair Hooker
 Bryan Hooks
 Tam Hopkins
 Wes Hopkins
 Mike Horan
 Don Horn
 Joe Horn
 Robert Horn
 Ron Hornsby
 Ethan Horton
 Jason Horton
 Jeff Hostetler
 James Hough
 John Wesley Houser Jr.
 Artis Houston
 Dana Howard
 Paul Howard
 Todd Howard
 Delles Howell
 Chuck Howley
 Bill Howton
 Chris Hudson
 Ken Huff
 David Hughes
 Tyrone Hughes
 Michael Hull
 Corey Hulsey
 David Humm
 Leonard Humphries
 Ricky Hunley
 Daniel Hunter Jr.
 Patrick Hunter
 Bill Hurley
 Maurice Hurst
 Scott Hutchinson
 Martin Imhof
 Rene Ingoglia
 Brian Ingram
 Byron Ingram
 Darryl Ingram
 Jerry Inman
 Joseph Iorio
 Gerald Irons Sr.
 Sedrick Irvin
 Darrell Irvin
 Heath Irwin
 Raghib Ismail
 Chris Jackie
 Brad Jackson
 Calvin Jackson
 Clarence "Jazz" Jackson
 Dexter Jackson
 Harold Jackson
 Jeffrey P. Jackson
 James Jackson
 Melvin Jackson Jr.
 Michael Jackson
 Rich "Tombstone" Jackson
 Rickey Jackson
 Scott Jackson
 Vestee Jackson
 Harry Jacobs
 Kendyl Jacox
 Roland James
 George Jamison
 John Janata
 Ernie Janet
 Bruce Jarvis
 Leon "Ray" Jarvis
 Jim Jeffcoat
 Dameian Jeffries
 Noel Jenke
 Kenneth Jenkins
 Alfred Jenkins
 Izel Jenkins
 Ronney Jenkins
 Melvin Jenkins
 Alred Jenkins
 Keith Jennings
 John Jennings
 Russell Jensen
 Jerry Jensen
 Jim C. Jensen
 Jim D. Jensen
 Ron Jessie
 Anthony (Tony) Jeter
 Thomas Jeter
 James (Jim) Bowman
 Jim Jodat
 Akili Johnson
 Albert Johnson III
 Alex Dexter Johnson
 Allen Johnson
 Anthony Johnson
 Chris W. Johnson
 Jack Johnson
 Jarrod Johnson
 John Johnson
 Kermit Johnson
 Kevin Johnson
 Larry Johnson Sr.
 Marty Johnson
 Mitchell Johnson
 Olrick Johnson
 Rob Johnson
 Sidney Johnson
 Todd Johnson
 Troy Johnson
 Trumaine Johnson
 Undra Johnson
 Vaughn Johnson
 Joseph Johnston
 Aaron Jones
 Anthony Jones
 Broderick Jones
 Clinton Jones
 Darrel Earl Jones
 Daryll Jones
 Donald Jones
 Douglas C. Jones
 Ernest Jones
 Gary Jones
 George Jones
 James Jones
 Jeffrey Jones
 Kenneth Jones
 Kirk Cameron Jones
 Larry Jones
 Markeysia Jones
 Marvin Jones
 Michael L. Jones
 Selwyn Jones
 Steve Jones
 Victor Jones
 Willie Jones
 Leander Jordan
 Lee Roy Jordan
 Richard Jordan
 David Jordon
 Keith Joseph
 Matt Joyce
 Seth Joyner
 William Judson
 William Judson
 Kerry Justin
 Sydney Justin
 Isaiah Kacyvenski
 Mark Kafentzis
 Salaam-El Kamal Ali
 Larry Kaminski
 Carl Kammerer
 Rick Kane
 Joe Kapp
 Ted Karras
 Alex Karras
 Steve Keese
 Percy Keith
 Ernie Kellermann
 Leroy Kelly
 Robert Kelly III
 Todd Kelly
 Derek Kennard
 Allan Kennedy
 Lincoln Kennedy
 Rex Kern
 Wade Key
 Cedric Killings
 Bruce Kimball
 Steve Kiner
 Angelo King
 Ed King
 Horace King
 Kenny King
 Lamar King
 Linden King
 Shawn King
 Stephen King
 Kelly Kirchbaum
 Randall Kirk
 Louis Kirouac
 Michael Kiselak
 Jim Kitts
 Bruce Klostermann
 Gary Knafelc
 Bryan Knight
 David Knight
 Roger Knight
 Sammy Knight
 Tommy Knight
 Pete Koch
 Dave Kocourek
 Robert Kohrs
 John Kompara
 Mark Koncar
 Scott Kooistra
 Jeff Kopp
 Ken Kortas
 Steve Korte
 Scott Kowalkowski
 Merv Krakau
 Joe Krakoski
 Joseph Krakoski
 Kyle Kramer
 Bob Kratch
 Daniel Kratzer
 Paul Krause
 Dave Krieg
 Robert Kroll
 Charlie Krueger
 Rudy Kuechenberg
 Ralph Kurek
 Fulton Kuykendall
 Ted Kwalick
 Paul Laaveg
 Greg Lafleur
 Bruce Laird
 Greg Landry
 Robert Landsee
 Eric Lane
 MacArthur Lane
 Paul Lane
 Gene Lang
 Kenard Lang
 Le-Lo Lang
 Jevon Langford
 Ken Lanier
 Dan Larose
 Bill Larson
 Greg Larson
 Pete Larson
 William (Bill) Laskey
 JJ Lasley
 Derrick Lassic
 Lamar Lathon
 Don Latimer
 Paul Latzke
 Robert Lavette Jr.
 Henry Lawrence
 Pete Lazetich
 Edward P. Lee
 Keith Lee
 Burnie Legette
 Tyrone Legette
 Brad Legget
 Teddy Lehman
 Ashley Lelie
 Frank LeMaster
 Greg Lens
 A.D. Lester
 Tim Lester
 Otis Leverette
 Dorsey Levens
 Bill Lewis
 D.D. Lewis
 David Lewis
 Davis R. Lewis
 Derrick Lewis
 Eddie Lewis
 Frank Lewis
 Gregory Lewis
 Jamal Lewis
 Kevin Lewis
 Thomas Lewis
 Samuel Lilly
 Bob Lilly
 Scott Lindsay
 Larry Linne
 Ronnie Lippett
 Tony Liscio
 Floyd Little
 Greg Lloyd
 Frank Lockett
 Scott Lockwood
 Marc Logan
 Chip Lohmiller
 Jacqueline London
 David Long
 Tom Lopienski
 Zechariah Lord
 Ed Lothamer
 Andre Lott
 Thomas Lott
 Ronald Lou
 Tom Louderback
 Warren Loving
 David Lucas Jr.
 Nicolas Luchey
 Kai Ludwig
 Bill Lueck
 Steve Luke
 Bob Lurtsema
 Michael Lush
 Fran Lynch
 Don Macek
 Mark Maddox
 Reno Mahe
 Don Majkowski
 Van Malone
 Tony Mandarich
 William H. Mandley
 Wade Manning
 Tim Manoa
 Donald Manoukian
 Todd Marinovich
 Fred Marion
 Mitchell Marrow
 Curt Marsh
 Anthony Marshall
 Leonard Marshall
 Cecil Martin
 Douglas Martin
 Emanuel Martin
 Eric Martin
 Jamar Martin
 Matt Martin
 Rod Martin
 Anthony Martin
 Lonnie Marts Jr.
 Michael Mason
 Tommy Mason
 Billy Masters
 William Matan
 Ira Matthews
 Shane Matthews
 Vernon Maxwell
 Deems May
 Mark May
 Alonzo Mayes
 Frederick Mazurek
 Gene McArthur
 Kevin McArthur
 Gerald McBurrows
 Michael McCaffrey
 Reese McCall
 Don McCauley
 Dewey McClain
 Brent McClanahan
 Kenneth McClendan
 Tommy McCleskey
 Hurvin McCormack
 Mike McCoy
 Fred McCrary
 Gregory McCrary
 George McCullough Jr.
 Ron McDole
 David Michael McDonald
 Tommy McDonald
 Bubba McDowell
 Leonard "Bubba" McDowell Jr.
 Antonio McGee
 Ben McGee
 Dell McGee
 Tony McGee
 Mark McGrath
 Don McIlhenny
 Jeff McIntyre
 Reggie McKenzie
 Seth McKinney
 Steve McKinney
 Dennis McKnight
 Ted McKnight
 Tim McKyer
 Dana McLemore
 Kevin McLeod
 Kevin McLeod
 Dexter McCleon
 Donald McIlhenny
 Jim McMahon
 Don McNeal
 Fred McNeill
 Rod McSwain
 Michael Meade
 Karl Mecklenburg
 Bob Meeks
 Lance Mehl
 Jon Melander
 Chuck Mercein
 Richard Mercier
 Rondorick Merkerson
 Jim Merlo
 Mike Merriweather
 Aaron Merz
 Dale Messer
 Terrance Metcalf
 Terry Metcalf
 Rich Miano
 John Michels
 Bobby Micho
 Frank Middleton
 Ron Middleton
 Jermaine Miles
 Bryan Millard
 Anthony Miller
 Brett Miller
 Bronzell Miller
 Caleb Miller
 Calvin Miller
 Charles E. Miller
 Cleophus "Cleo" Miller
 Danny Miller
 Carl Miller
 Robert Miller
 Robert T. Miller
 Claudie Minor Jr.
 Travis Minor
 Kory Minor
 Aaron Mitchell
 Carlence Mitchell
 Darrell Mitchell
 Lyvonia A. Mitchell
 Mel Mitchell
 Pete Mitchell
 Shannon Mitchell
 Singor Mobley
 Art Monk
 Matthew Monoger
 Anthony Montgomery
 James Montgomery
 Marv Montgomery
 Ty Montgomery
 Peter Monty
 Michael Moody
 Alvin Moore
 Dave Moore
 Derland Moore
 Ezekiel Moore Jr.
 Jerald Moore
 Otis Moore Jr.
 Stevon Moore
 Emery Moorehead
 Stanley Morgan
 Thomas Moriarty
 Bryan Morris
 Randall Morris
 Fred Morrison
 David Morton
 Michael Morton
 Michael Mosley
 Zefross Moss
 Ronald Moten
 Zeke Mowatt
 Edwin Mulitalo
 Mark Murphy
 Calvin Murray
 Michael Myers
 Toby Myles
 Chip Myrtle
 Tom Nütten
 Gern Nagler
 Ricky Nattiel
 Omar Nazel
 Leon Neal
 Larry Ned
 Ralph Neely
 Robert Neff
 John Neidert
 Billy Neighbors
 Curtis Nelson
 Darrin Nelson
 Steve Nelson
 Doug Nettles
 Keith Neubert
 Ryan Neufeld
 Tom Newberry
 Michael Newell
 Bob Newland
 Anthony Newman
 Antonio Newson
 Robert Newton
 Mark Nichols
 Jack Nix
 Frederick Nixon
 Jeff Nixon
 Tommy Nobis
 Brian Noble
 Danny Noonan
 Karl Noonan
 Keith Nord
 Joe Norman
 Josh Norman
 Jerry Norton
 Jeff Novak
 Brent Novoselsky
 Frank Nunley
 Jeremy Nunley
 Matt O'Dwyer
 Brian O'Neal
 McDonald Oden
 Chris Oldham
 Hubie Oliver
 Brock Olivo
 Harold Olson
 Dave Osborn
 Scot Osborne
 Willie Oshodin
 Gus Otto
 Bob Otto
 John Outlaw
 Charles Owens
 Joe Owens
 Morris Owens
 R.C. Owens
 Richard Owens
 Terry Owens
 Ken Oxendine
 Gary Padjen
 Mike Pagel
 Joseph Pagliei
 Thida Paing
 David Palmer
 Richard Palmer
 Sterling Palmer
 Chris Pane
 Irv Pankey
 Joe Panos
 Ezekiel Parker
 Frank Parker
 Sirr Parker
 Brent Parkinson
 Don Parrish
 Richard Parson Jr.
 Patrick Pass
 Dan Pastorini
 Jerome Pathon
 Garin Patrick
 Roosevelt Patterson
 Mark Pattison
 Reginald Payne
 Eddie Payton
 Dave Pear
 Jayice Pearson
 Preston Pearson
 Erric Pegram
 Tupe Peko
 Bob Pellegrini
 Robert Penchion
 Christopher Penn
 John Pergine
 Antonio Perkins
 Ralph Perretta
 Brett Perriman
 Ed Perry
 Vernon Perry
 Christian Peter
 Kurt Petersen
 Jason Phillips
 Joe Phillips
 Charles Philyaw
 Lou Piccone
 Steve Pierce
 Mike Pike
 Jerrell Pippens
 Steve Pisarkiewicz
 Mike Pitts
 Dave Pivec
 Scott Player
 Art Plunkett
 Kris Pollack
 Frank Pollard
 Tommy Polley
 Keith Ponder
 David Pool
 Bob Poole
 Keith Poole
 Daryl Porter
 Ron Porter
 Myron Pottios
 Roosevelt Potts
 Craig Powell
 Karl Powe
 Marvin Powell
 Warren Powers
 Eugene Prebola
 Roell Preston
 Ray Preston
 Dave Preston
 Derek Price
 Anthony Prior
 Ron Pritchard
 Stanley Pritchett Jr.
 Wesley Pritchett
 Joe Profit
 Robert Prout
 Greg Pruitt
 James Pruitt
 Mickey Pruitt
 Michael Pucillo
 Jethro Pugh
 Brad Quast
 Richard Quast
 Bill Rademacher
 Wayne Radloff
 Randy Ragon
 Wali Rainer
 Mike Raines
 Gregory Randall
 Ervin Randle
 Thomas C. Randolph, II
 Saleem Rasheed
 Terry Ray
 Corey Raymond
 Rick Razzano, Sr.
 Gary Reasons
 Ken Reaves
 David Recher
 Jamaica Rector
 Rudy Redmond
 Clarence Reece
 Willis J. Reed
 John Reeves Jr.
 Kenneth Reeves
 Brandon Register
 Mike Reichenbach
 Lamont Reid
 Johnny Rembert
 Leonard Renfro
 Melvin Renfro
 Glenn Ressler
 Alan Reuber Jr.
 Fuad Reveiz
 Derrick S. Reynolds
 Jacoby Rhinehart
 Kris Richard
 John Richards
 Bucky Richardson
 Gloster Richardson
 Mike C. Richardson
 Mike Richardson
 Robert Richardson Jr.
 David Richie
 Thomas Ricketts Jr.
 Joseph Righetti
 Karon Riley
 Constantin Ritzmann
 Donald Rives
 Randy Robbins
 James Roberson
 Greg Roberts
 Walter Roberts
 William Roberts
 Bernard Robertson
 Jamal Robertson
 James E. Robbins
 Edward Robinson Jr.
 Jerry Robinson
 Mark Robinson
 Brian Roche
 Paul Rochester
 Michael Rockwood
 Rodrick Rodgers
 George Rogers
 John E. Rogers
 Kendrick Rogers
 Reggie Rogers
 Samuel Rogers
 Len Rohde
 Johnny Roland
 Donald Rolle
 Dave Roller
 John Roman
 Jim Romano
 Brett Romberg
 Tag Rome
 Andre Rone
 Dedrick Roper
 Scott Ross
 James Rouke
 Lee Rouson
 John Rowser
 Rob Rubick
 Todd Rucci
 Reggie Rucker
 Council Rudolph
 Jerry Rush
 Michael Rusinek
 Leonard Russell
 Reynard Rutherford
 Johnny Rutledge
 Frank Ryan
 Sean Ryan
 Mark Rypien
 Paul Ryzek
 Roderick Saddler
 Len St. Jean
 Sean Salisbury
 Clarence Sanders
 Michael Sandusky
 Rick Sanford
 O.J. Santiago
 Patrick Sapp
 Theron Sapp
 Kevin Sargent
 John Sawyer
 Noel Scarlett
 Mike Schad
 Dick Schafrath
 Michael Schneck
 Mike Schnitker
 Matt Schobel
 Ken Schroy
 Steve Schubert
 Gregg Schumacher
 Brad Scioli
 Clarence Scott
 Leon Searcy
 Mark Seay
 Michael Seidman
 Robert Selby
 Andrew Selfridge
 Muhammad Shamsiddeen
 Carver Shannon
 Dennis Shaw
 Curtis Shearer
 Chris Shelling
 Daimon Shelton
 Thomas Sherman
 Timothy Sherwin
 Paul Shields
 Billy Shields
 Sanders Shiver
 Roy Shivers
 Roger Shoals
 Charles Shonta
 Les Shy
 Michael Siani
 Ricky Siglar
 Ed Simmons
 King Simmons
 Sam Simmons
 Ed Simonini
 Keith Sims
 David Sims
 Nate Singleton
 Daryle Skaugstad
 Douglas Skene
 Tom Skladany
 John Skorupan
 Tavaris Slaughter
 TJ Slaughter
 David Sloan
 Jessie Small
 Torrance Small
 Fred Smerlas
 Ben Smith
 Carl D. Smith
 Charlie Smith
 Dave Smith
 Dennis Smith
 Fernando Smith
 Franky L. Smith
 Gordon Smith
 Irvin Smith
 James Smith
 Jerry Smith
 John Smith
 John H. Smith
 John T. Smith
 Lance Smith
 Philip Smith
 Rico Smith
 Russ Smith
 Tony Smith
 Jeff Smith
 Thomas L. Smith Jr.
 Timothy L. Smith
 Zuriel Smith
 Fred Smoot
 Jack Snow
 Jesse Solomon
 Ron Solt
 Michael Sommer
 Tom Sorensen
 Phillippi Sparks
 Armegis Spearman
 Ernest Spears
 Jimmy Spencer
 Maurice Spencer
 Greg Spires
 Jack Squirek
 Richard Stachon
 Walter Stanley
 Tony Stargell
 Ralph Staten Jr.
 Joel Steed
 Glen Steele
 James Steffen
 Rich Stephens
 Richard Stevens
 Santo Stephens
 Andrew Stewart
 James Stewart
 Ryan Stewart
 Arthur Still
 Shyrone Stith
 Ralph Stockemer
 Terry Stoepel
 Bryan Stoltenberg
 Dwight Stone
 Michael Stonebreaker
 William Story
 Tyronne Stowe
 Mike Strachan
 Arthur Stringer
 Michael Stromberg
 James Strong Jr.
 Daniel Stubbs
 Pat Studstill
 Robert Suci
 Lee Suggs
 Shafer Suggs
 Daniel Sullivan
 John Sullivan
 James Summers
 Kywin Supernaw
 Patrick Surtain
 Ed Sutter
 Ryan Sutter
 Eric Sutton
 Reggie Sutton
 Terrell Sutton
 Bill Swain
 Reggie Swinton
 Patrick Swoopes
 Jeff Sydner
 Joseph Taffoni
 Joseph Tafoya
 Diron Talbert
 Don Talbert
 Barron Tanner
 Maa Tanuvasa
 Jack Tatum
 Terry Tausch
 Eugene Taylor
 Gregory Taylor
 Jay Taylor
 Roger Taylor
 Willie Taylor
 Larry Tearry
 Larry Tharpe
 R.C. Thielemann
 Anthony Thomas
 Charles Thomas
 Chuck Thomas
 Earl Thomas
 Joseph E. Thomas
 Kevin Thomas
 Lamar Thomas
 Lavale Thomas
 Rodell Thomas
 Rodney Thomas
 Anthony Thompson
 David Thompson
 Ernest Thompson
 Woody Thompson
 Vince Thomson
 Sidney Thorton
 Steve Thurlow
 John Tice
 Lewis Tilman
 Travares Tillman
 Mick Tingelhoff
 Glen Titensor
 Love James Tolbert
 Jeffrey Tootle
 Thomas Toth
 Stephen Towle
 Richard Trapp
 Dennis Tripp
 Jeremiah Trotter
 Billy Truax
 Don Trull
 Jerry Tubbs
 Robert Tucker
 Ryan Tucker
 Wendell Tucker
 Jessie Tuggle
 Godwin Turk
 Kyle Turley
 John Turner
 Kevin Turner
 Odessa Turner
 Maurice Tyler
 Wendell Tyler
 Eric Unverzagt
 Zack Valentine
 Bruce Van Dyke
 Billy Van Heusen
 Keith Van Horne
 Phil Vandersea
 James VanWagner
 Frank Varrichione
 Jon Vaughn
 Clarence Vaughn
 Alan Veingrad
 Patrick Venzke
 Clarence Verdin
 Kevin Verdugo
 Phil Villapiano
 Justin Vincent
 George Visger
 Stu Voigt
 Joan Wakeley
 Mark Walczak
 Kerwin Waldroup
 Bruce Walker
 Jackie Walker
 Jeffrey Walker
 Jeffrey L. Walker
 Malcolm Walker
 Sammy Walker
 Anthony Walker Jr.
 Wayne Walker
 Larry Wallace
 Roger Wallace
 Steve Wallace
 Chris Walsh
 Ward W. Walsh
 Ken Walter
 Zack Walz
 Dedric Ward
 Curt Warner
 Alvin Washington
 Brian Washington
 Dave Washington Jr.
 Joe Washington
 Mike Washington
 David Wasick
 Charlie Waters
 Lawrence Watkins
 Ira Watley
 Frank Wattelet II
 Theodore Watts
 Robert Weathers
 Cephus Weatherspoon
 Charles Weaver
 Jed Weaver
 Larry Webster
 Nate Webster
 Floyd Wedderburn
 Michael Weddington
 Bert Weidner
 Jonathan Welsh
 Tom Welter
 Ralph Wenzel
 Derek West
 Ed West
 Larry Whigham
 David M. White
 Edward White
 James Curtis White
 Lonnie White
 Mitch White
 Patrick White
 Randy White
 Russell White
 Willie Whitehead
 James Whitley
 Kevin Whitley
 Arthur Whittington
 J.R. Wilburn
 James Wilder
 Eddie Wiliams
 Reggie Wilkes
 Gerald Willhite
 Kevin Willhite
 Brent Williams
 Calvin Williams
 Chris Williams
 Darryl Williams
 Derwin Williams
 James Williams
 Joel Williams
 John L. Williams
 John M. Williams
 Kendall Williams
 Michael C. Williams
 Newton Williams
 Randal Williams
 Scott Williams
 Fred Williamson
 Mitch Willis
 James Willis
 Donald Wilson
 Eddie Wilson
 Jerry Wilson
 Quincy Wilson
 Reinard Wilson
 Steve Wilson
 Troy Wilson
 Brandon Winey
 Dennis Winston
 Dennis Wirgowski
 Cory Withrow
 Joe Wolf
 Mike Wood
 Ken Woodard
 Shawn Wooden
 Richard Woodley
 Jerry Woods
 Larry Woods
 Robert Woods
 Marv Woodson
 Roscoe Word Jr.
 Darrly T. Wren
 Eric Wright
 Felix Wright
 Rayfield Wright
 Steve Wright
 Terry Wright
 Toby L. Wright
 Torrey Wright
 Renaldo Wynn
 Jimmy Wyrick
 James Yarbrough
 Jeff Yeates
 Garo Yepremian
 Maurice Youmans
 Adrian Young
 Michael Young
 Richard Young
 Frank Youso
 Steve Zabel
 Carl Zander
 Emanuel Zanders
 Connie Zelenick
 Paul Zukauskas

See also
 Concussions in American football
 Concussion
 League of Denial
 Helmet-to-helmet collision
 Health issues in American football
 National Football League controversies
 The Hit (Chuck Bednarik)

References

NFL players with chronic traumatic encephalopathy
NFL players with chronic traumatic encephalopathy
Chronic traumatic encephalopathy
NFL players with chronic traumatic encephalopathy
 
National Football League controversies